William Joseph Williams (November 17, 1759 – November 30, 1823) was an American portrait and miniature painter.

Biography 
He was born in New York City, the son of William Williams, a Welsh painter born in Bristol, and Mary Mare Williams, sister of the painter John Mare.

Williams resided in New Bern, North Carolina from 1804 to 1823, after living in Philadelphia, Georgetown, and Charleston.

He painted portraits of Presidents Washington and John Adams, as well as other important figures of his time.

Williams died in New Bern and buried in Cedar Grove Cemetery. Today, Williams is viewed as one of the first American national portraitists.

References

External links 

 About Williams' painting of Washington, National Portrait Gallery Archived
 American Gallery: William Joseph Williams (1759–1823)

1759 births
1823 deaths
18th-century American painters
18th-century American male artists
American male painters
19th-century American painters
19th-century American male artists
People from New Bern, North Carolina
Painters from North Carolina
Painters from New York City
American people of Welsh descent
People from Georgetown (Washington, D.C.)